Lady Magdalene's is a film directed, written and produced by J. Neil Schulman and starring Nichelle Nichols (who also received an executive producer credit). The movie was J. Neil Schulman's debut as a director, and Nichelle Nichols' debut as a producer.

Plot
Jack Goldwater, an IRS agent on loan to the Federal Air Marshal Service, is relieved of field duty after insulting a powerful U.S. senator, and finds himself exiled to a humiliating desk job in Nevada as the federal receiver managing a legal brothel in tax default, where—with the help of the brothel Madam, Lady Magdalene—he uncovers an Al Qaeda plot to unload a nuclear-bomb-sized crate at Hoover Dam.

Cast (opening titles)
Nichelle Nichols as Lady Magdalene
Ethan Keogh as Jack Goldwater
Susan Smythe as Angel
Claudia Lynx as Scheherazade
Alexander Wraith as Yassin Salem
Mark Gilvary as The Director & FBI SAC Broderick
J. Neil Schulman as Ali the American
Said Faraj as Gamal Hosny
Mara Marini as Nurse Gretchen
Vince Martorano as IRS Agent Lewis Heinlein
Hope McBane as Sinead
Michele Redmond as Eden
Keyaria Rodriguez as Pixie

Release
The movie was produced by Schulman's own film company Jesulu Productions. After film-festival play the full movie was released on YouTube.

Awards
The film won three film-festival awards: "Best Cutting Edge Film" at the 2008 San Diego Film Festival, "Audience Choice -- Feature-Length Narrative Film" at the 2008 Cinema City International Film Festival held on the Universal Hollywood Citywalk, and "Special Jury Prize for Libertarian Ideals" at the 2011 Anthem Film Festival/FreedomFest held at Bally's Las Vegas.

References

External links

2008 films
Fictional characters from Nevada
Films set in Nevada
American independent films
2008 comedy films
2008 directorial debut films
2000s English-language films
2000s American films